Henk Dijkhuizen (born 9 June 1992) is a Dutch professional footballer who plays as a right-back for Patro Eisden. He formerly played for Sparta Rotterdam and Roda JC.

Career
On 4 January 2020, Dijkhuizen joined TOP Oss on a contract for the rest of the season. In September 2020, he signed with Belgian club Patro Eisden.

References

External links
 
 

1992 births
Living people
Footballers from The Hague
Dutch footballers
Dutch expatriate footballers
Netherlands under-21 international footballers
SVV Scheveningen players
Sparta Rotterdam players
Roda JC Kerkrade players
TOP Oss players
K. Patro Eisden Maasmechelen players
Eredivisie players
Eerste Divisie players
Belgian National Division 1 players
Expatriate footballers in Belgium
Dutch expatriate sportspeople in Belgium
Association football defenders